Calwood Township is one of eighteen townships in Callaway County, Missouri, USA.  As of the 2010 census, its population was 1,097.

History
Calwood Township was established February 23, 1876, carved out of the southwestern sector of a heretofore larger Nine Mile Prairie Township, and named after the community of Calwood, Missouri.

Calwood was formerly known as "Moore's Mill", since a steam mill owned by Moore was located there.  The Civil War Battle of Moore's Mill was fought nearby in 1862.

Geography
It contains one cemetery, Fairview.

The streams of Dyers Branch, Harrison Branch, Houfs Branch, Maddox Branch, Pinch Creek and Richland Creek run through this township.

References

 USGS Geographic Names Information System (GNIS)

External links
 US-Counties.com
 City-Data.com

Townships in Callaway County, Missouri
Jefferson City metropolitan area
Townships in Missouri